Messaoud Hai Victor Perez (18 October 1911 – 21 January 1945) was a Tunisian Jewish boxer, who became the World Flyweight Champion in 1931 and 1932, fighting under his ring name Young Perez. He was managed by Leon Bellier. He was murdered in the Holocaust.

Early life
Perez was born to Sephardic Jewish parents Khomsa "Khmaïssa" Nizard, and Makhlouf "Khaïlou" René Perez, a household goods salesman. He was raised along with his four siblings in Dar-El Berdgana, the Jewish quarter of Tunis. He started training as a boxer at age 14 along with his older brother Benjamin “Kid” Perez to emulate his idol Battling Siki, a boxing champion from Senegal. Near the end of 1928, after competing against the best of the local boxing talent in Tunis, at 17 Perez traveled to Paris, to pursue his dream of becoming a world boxing champion. In his youth, after winning the World flyweight title, he had a brief relationship with French-Italian actress Mireille Balin of Monaco.

Boxing career

French Fly champion, 1931
Perez's first attempt at France's Flyweight championship came on 8 February 1930, but resulted in a 4th round loss to Henry "Kid" Oliva in Limoges, France.

In only his 54th professional match, Perez won the French Flyweight title in Paris on 4 June 1931, defeating Valentin Angelmann in 15 rounds.

World Fly champion, October 1931
On 24 October 1931, he won the International Boxing Union and National Boxing Association (NBA) World Flyweight crown at Paris's famed Palais de Sports in a second round knockout of the exceptional American boxer Frankie Genaro. Perez seemed awed by the American champion who appeared to take the first round after a rally just before the bell. But responding to an attempt at a left hook by Genaro, Perez proved speedier and tagged his opponent with a crushing right hook to the chin that ended the match only ten seconds into round two. Although Genaro struggled to his knees by the count of eight, he was unable to get any further before the referee completed the count. The loss was only Genaro's second by knockout in his long career. Perez subsequently became the youngest French citizen to win a world boxing title.

Facing stiff competition, he lost the title the next year, on 31 October 1932, to Jackie Brown in a twelve round points decision in Manchester, England. He then moved to the bantamweight class. In an attempt at the World Bantamweight title on 19 February 1934, he was defeated in a difficult 15 round bout by "Panama" Al Brown, who held a ten inch height advantage. He retired from boxing in December 1938 with a record of 92 wins (28 of them knockouts), 26 losses, and 15 draws.

Auschwitz
On 21 September 1943, after being denounced by an acquaintance, Perez was arrested in Paris by the Milice Francaise, a French collaborationist paramilitary force of the Vichy Regime. He was detained in the Drancy internment camp before being transported to the German extermination camp of Auschwitz where he was assigned to the Monowitz subcamp to serve as a slave laborer for I.G. Farben at the Buna-Werke.

During his transport to Auschwitz on 7 October 1943, he became part of "Transport 60" a group of 1,000 prisoners shipped from Drancy, in France. During his internment, he was forced to participate in boxing matches for the amusement of the German guards and officers. By 1945, Perez was one of just 31 survivors of the original 1,000.

To escape from the Russians rapidly advancing on German held territory, the Nazis abandoned Auschwitz in January 1945. On 18 January 1945, Perez became one of the prisoners on the death march from Monowitz in Poland,  Northwest to the Gleiwitz concentration camp near the Czech border. Perez was reported to have been murdered three days later on 21 January. According to eye witness testimony he was shot to death by a guard while attempting to distribute bread he had found in Gleiwitz's kitchen to other starving prisoners.

Legacy 
He was inducted into the International Jewish Sports Hall of Fame in 1986. In 2013, his life was made into the French and German-language film Victor Young Perez (also known as Surviving Auschwitz or Perez ha'tza'ir). Perez's role was played by the 2000 French Olympic Gold medalist in light-flyweight boxing, Brahim Asloum.

Selected fights

|-
|+ 5 wins, 4 losses
|-
! Result
! Opponent(s)
! Date
! Location
! Duration
! Notes
|-
| Win
| Valentin Angelmann
| 4 June 1931
| Paris
| 15 rounds
| Won French Fly title
|-
| Win
| Frankie Genaro
| 26 October 1931
| Paris
| 2nd round KO
| Won NBA World Fly title
|-
| Loss
| Jackie Brown
| 31 October 1932
| Manchester, Eng.
| 13 round TKO
| Lost NBA World Fly title
|-
| Win
| Émile Pladner
| 24 January 1933
| Tunis
| 10 rounds
|  
|-
| Loss
| Baltasar Sangchili
| 18 March 1933
| Valencia, Spain
| 10 rounds
| 1935 World Bantam champ
|-
| Loss
| Jackie Brown
| 3 July 1933
| Manchester, Eng.
| 12 rounds KO
| For NBA World Fly title
|-
| Loss
| Panama Al Brown
| 19 February 1934
| Paris
| 15 rounds UD
| For World Bantam title
|-
| Win
| Émile Pladner
| 11 July 1934
| Paris
| 10 rounds
|  
|-
| Win
| Eugène Huat
| 14 April 1936
| Tunis
| 10 rounds
|  
|}

See also
List of Jews in sports#Boxing

References

External links
Victor Perez at The Wollheim Memorial
Cyber Boxing Zone bio

1911 births
1945 deaths
Tunisian male boxers
Jewish Tunisian sportspeople
Sephardi Jews who died in the Holocaust
Jewish boxers
Flyweight boxers
World boxing champions
World flyweight boxing champions
French civilians killed in World War II
French people who died in Auschwitz concentration camp
Sportspeople from Tunis
Drancy internment camp prisoners
French male boxers
French Jews who died in the Holocaust
Deaths by firearm in Poland
French people executed by Nazi Germany
People executed by Nazi Germany by firearm
Auschwitz boxers
The Holocaust in Tunisia